Submarine X-1 is a 1968 British war film loosely based on the Operation Source attack on the German battleship Tirpitz in 1943. In the film, James Caan stars as Lt. Commander Richard Bolton, a Canadian, who must lead a group of midget submarines in an attack on a German battleship.

Plot
In 1943, a Royal Canadian Navy Volunteer Reserve officer from Canada, Commander Bolton (James Caan) and a few surviving crew members of his 50-man submarine Gauntlet swim ashore after unsuccessfully attacking German battleship Lindendorf. After a review, Captain Bolton is cleared of any wrongdoing and placed in charge of a small group of experimental X-class submarines. Bolton is assigned by Vice-Admiral Redmayne (Rupert Davies) to quickly train crews to man the submarines and sink the Lindendorf while it is hidden away in a Norwegian fjord.

Commander Bolton is to train three 4-man crews along the northern coast of Scotland for a trio of midget submarines equipped with side cargoes of explosives. He must overcome tensions with some of his former crew members, while keeping their activities hidden from outsiders and German airplanes. The crews successfully fend off an attack by German parachute commandos, who discover their base. Bolton is forced to make hasty preparations for his attack before their submarine base can be destroyed.

Two of the submarines are lost while attempting to cut through submarine nets at the entrance to the fjord. X-2, is sunk by a German E-boat's depth charges, and a second, the X-1, is scuttled. One submarine crew is captured and taken to the German battleship for interrogation. X-3, the surviving submarine penetrates the submarine nets in the fjord and places explosives under the German battleship. The submarine then manages to escape as the battleship explodes.

The real X-3 was the first fully operational x-craft but was lost during a training exercise although the crew escaped using Davis escape apparatus. X-1 and X-2 were in reality allocated to a submarine cruiser (scrapped 1936) and a captured Italian submarine, the latter later receiving the Pennant Number P711 instead. It was actually the midget submarine X-7 which successfully laid charges under the Tirpitz although the crew were captured shortly after. Another midget sub X-5 may also have laid charges but her fate is unknown.

Cast
 James Caan as Commander Bolton R.C.N.V.R
 David Sumner as Lt. Davies R.N.V.R.
 Norman Bowler as Sub. Lt. Pennington
 Brian Grellis as C.P.O. Barquist
 Paul Young as Leading Seaman Quentin
 William Dysart as Lt. Gogan R.N.R.
 John Kelland as Sub. Lt. Willis R.N.V.R.
 Kenneth Farrington as C.P.O. Boker Knowles
 Keith Alexander as Sub. Lt. X-3
 Carl Rigg as C.P.O. Kennedy
 Steve Kirby as Leading Seaman X-2
 Nicholas Tate as Leading Seaman X-1
 George Pravda as Captain Erlich
 Rupert Davies as Vice-Admiral Redmayne (uncredited)

Production
The film was one of a series of war movies made by Walter Mirisch in Britain with an imported American star in the lead.

See also
 Above Us the Waves is a similar film about the true-life submarine attacks on the Tirpitz.
 Operation Source details the use of X class submarines against German battleships in World War II.
 Tirpitz the real-life German battleship attacked by British X class submarines during World War II in a Norwegian fjord.

References

External links 
 
 
 
 
 
 Submarine X-1 at Yahoo! Movies

1968 films
British war films
1960s English-language films
Films set in 1943
Royal Navy in World War II films
Seafaring films based on actual events
World War II films based on actual events
World War II submarine films
Films scored by Ron Goodwin
Films directed by William Graham (director)
1960s British films